SABC SPORT is a South African free-to-air sports television channel owned by the South African Broadcasting Corporation (SABC).

The channel was operating for a while on DTT before expanding on other platforms. After its expansion, the channel is now the top 10 most watched channels on Openview pulling over 1.4. million viewers.

History
In 1991, TV2, TV3 and TV4 (now SABC 1-3) were combined into a new service called CCV (Contemporary Community Values). A third channel was introduced known as TSS, or TopSport Surplus, TopSport being the brand name for the SABC's sport coverage, but this was replaced by NNTV (National Network TV), an educational, non-commercial channel, in 1993.

In 1996, SABC Sport established a sport brand to provides full coverage of live events, jam-packed highlights, fixtures, and live crossings! The only window for you to consume the sporting events you love, in your language of choice, with no barrier to entry, making it accessible to all.

In 2012, The SABC planned to invest R732.7 million over the next two years to set up SABC Sport as a separate TV channel in South Africa on October 1. They also signed a multimillion rand deal with America's NBA to show full coverage on SABC Sport and selected matches to SABC 1 to prevent viewing disruption before missing the deadline.

In 2015, they scrapped their initial plans for DTT and downsized to 5 channels with one of them being SABC Sport.

In 2018, they scrapped their unfunded initial plans from 2015 and opted to launch another 4 unfunded channels being SABC Parliament, SABC History, SABC Education and SABC Health with SABC Sport still present in their portfolio.

In October 2020, Telkom Mobile launches its TelkomONE video streaming service including linear TV channels such as SABC Education on its free package.

In November 2022, Just few days before 2022 FIFA World Cup Qatar Could start, SABC announced the new streaming service SABC Plus OTT in partnership with Hisense Group South Africa. SABC Plus has replace TelkomONE as it seems that SABC has taken over the platform

In March 2021, eMedia Investments, owners of free-to-air satellite service Openview, and the SABC have reached a business agreement that sees Openview continue to broadcast high-definition channels SABC 1, 2 and 3, as well as 3 additional television channels with one being SABC Sport from the public broadcaster, as well as all 19 radio stations owned by the SABC. SABC Sport alongside their radio stations were made available on Openview from April 17.

In June 2021, the SABC hosted a live broadcast of the official launch of its Sports Channel following the successful soft launch of its 24 Hour Sports Channel on the SABC DTT service, the Openview set-top-box and the (Telkom ONE) now SABC Plus mobile streaming platform in April 2021. The launch also featured Team SAs announcement of the second team squad for the Tokyo 2020 Olympic Games on the Sports Channel. A month later, the channel's general manager mentioned in an interview with SAfm Radio that the SABC has considered launching a second sports channel.

Programming 
Sports Arena Weekends At 14:00

Cricket South Africa Inbound Tours

Bundesliga

Sports@10 Wednesdays At 22:00

Premier Soccer League

National Basketball Association

FIFA World Cup

South Africa national soccer team

Soccerzone Monday At 22:00

Top 14

Olympic Games

South African Sports Confederation and Olympic Committee

Eredivisie

Sky Bet Championship

Extreme E

Formula E

FIA WRC

Africa Cup of Nations

CAF Champions League

CAF Confederations Cup

J4Joy Boxing Tournaments

COSAFA Competitions

HollywoodBets Women's Super League

The Sasol League

World Sports Betting Live Horseracing

Protocol Boxing

EFC Fight Nights

ESPN Movies,Documentaries And Series

Netball World Cup 2023

World Sports Betting Carlton Cup

Davis Cup

Premier League

See also 
 List of South African media

References

External links

Television stations in South Africa
Television channels and stations established in 1996
Afrikaans-language television